The Calgary Flames are a professional ice hockey team based in Calgary, Alberta, Canada. The team is a member of the Pacific Division in the Western Conference of the National Hockey League (NHL). The Flames arrived in Calgary in 1980 after transferring from the city of Atlanta, Georgia, where they were known as the Atlanta Flames from their founding in 1972 until relocation. The 2021–22 season is the 41st season of play, and 42nd year in Calgary (2004–05 NHL season was not played). It is the 50th year for the Flames franchise, and including the team's time in Atlanta, the Flames have won over 1,800 regular season games, 12th overall in NHL history.

Calgary played its first season in the Patrick Division before moving to the Smythe when the NHL realigned along geographic lines in 1981. The Flames qualified for the playoffs each year from their arrival in 1980 until 1991. During that time, they won two Presidents' Trophies as the NHL's top regular season club, 1987–88 and 1988–89, captured the Clarence S. Campbell Bowl as Campbell Conference champions twice, 1985–86 and 1988–89, and won the Stanley Cup in 1989. The Flames fared poorly following their Cup win, failing to win another playoff series until 2004, a span of 15 seasons, during which they missed the playoffs eight times. The team returned to the post-season in 2004, making an unlikely trip to the Finals, during which the team captured its third Clarence Campbell Bowl by winning the Western Conference championship by becoming the first team in NHL history to defeat three division winners. Overall, the Flames have made 25 appearances in the Stanley Cup playoffs.

Season-by-season history

See also
 Atlanta Flames seasons

Notes

References

 
 
 

 
National Hockey League team seasons
seasons
Calgary Flames